The Legend of the Condor Heroes is a two-part Taiwanese television series adapted from Louis Cha's novel of the same title. The series was first broadcast on CTV in Taiwan in 1988.

Cast
 Howie Huang as Guo Jing
 Idy Chan as Huang Rong
 Poon Wang-ban as Yang Kang
 Chiu Shu-yi as Mu Nianci
 Lee I-min as Huang Yaoshi
 Lung Tien-hsiang as Ouyang Feng
 Chiang Sheng as Hong Qigong
 Lung Kuan-wu as Zhou Botong
 Ke Wei-chia as Ouyang Ke
 Chen Li-hua as Mei Chaofeng
 Yu Kuo-tong as Chen Xuanfeng
 Hsieh Ping-nan as Wanyan Honglie
 Yang Yuen-chang as Qiu Chuji
 Liu Yu-ping as Li Ping
 Hsiang Yun-peng as Yang Tiexin
 Lin Hsiu-chun as Bao Xiruo
 Fan Jih-hsing as Duan Zhixing
 Li Chi-chian as Genghis Khan
 Hsian Huan-chen as Huazheng
 Ting Hua-chung as Tolui
 Wei Hung as Jebe
 Huang Kuan-hsiung as Ma Yu
 Chiang Ying as Wang Chuyi
 Mao Ching-shun as Ke Zhen'e
 Ting Yang-kuo as Zhu Cong
 Hsu Jo-hua as Han Xiaoying
 Tang Fu-hsiung as Liang Ziweng
 Peng Yu-lan as Liu Ying
 Hsu Chia-jung as Wang Chongyang
 Li Lung-jin as Lu Chengfeng
 Liang Xiushen as Yue Fei

External links

1988 Taiwanese television series debuts
1988 Taiwanese television series endings
Television shows based on The Legend of the Condor Heroes
Television series set in the Southern Song
Television series set in the Jin dynasty (1115–1234)
Television series set in the Mongol Empire
Taiwanese wuxia television series
1980s Taiwanese television series
Depictions of Genghis Khan on television
Television shows set in Hangzhou